Anne Keothavong was the defending champion, but lost in the second round to French qualifier Constance Sibille.

Annika Beck won the title, defeating Eleni Daniilidou in the final, 6–7(1–7), 6–2, 6–2.

Seeds

Main draw

Finals

Top half

Bottom half

References 
 Main draw
 Qualifying draw

Aegon GB Pro-Series Barnstaple - Singles